The Lifesaving Medal was a civil decoration of the Kingdom of Prussia.  Established 1 February 1833, it was awarded to individuals who had saved another person's life, at risk to their own. This medal is referred to as the Lifesaving Medal on Band to differentiate it from a previous non-portable award established in 1802.  Otto von Bismarck received it for rescuing a drowning man.Bismarck

References

Orders, decorations, and medals of Prussia
1833 establishments in Prussia
Awards established in 1833
Lifesaving